The Max Linder Panorama is a cinema in Paris. It has been described as "one of the most beautiful Parisian movie theatres".

History

Inaugurated in 1912, the venue was quickly acquired by Max Linder, a pioneer of burlesque cinema.

Threatened with closure in the 1980s, the Max Linder was bought by a group of cinephiles with a view to restoration. Rather than subdividing the available space to allow for additional smaller screens (a popular solution at the time), the owners elected to preserve the original theatre and install a curved panoramic screen.

The cinema's screen, 18m wide, is one of the largest in Paris.

Programming

The Max Linder specialises in spectacular international productions, animations, and retrospectives.

References

External links
  – photos and description of Max Linder Panorama by web magazine in70mm.com

Cinemas in Paris